Pierre Moustiers (13 August 1924 – 6 June 2016) is the pen name of French writer Pierre Rossi.

Biography 
Under his pseudonym, he was successively laureate of the 1969 Grand prix du roman de l'Académie française, the 1972 Prix Maison de la Presse, the 1977 Prix des libraires, the 1997 Grand Prix d'Histoire Chateaubriand and the 2003 Prix du roman historique. He wrote the screenplay for the 1983 French miniseries Bel Ami; an adaptation of the 1885 novel of the same name by Guy de Maupassant.

Between 1973 and 2011, he wrote several scripts for films destined to French television.

Work

Under his pseudonym 
1957: 
1962: 
1962: 
1962: 
1969: , Grand prix du roman de l'Académie française 1969
1971: , Prix Maison de la Presse 1972
1973: 
1974: 
1976: , Prix des libraires 1977
1978: 
1984: 
1986: 
1990: 
1991: 
1993: 
1995: 
1997: , Grand Prix d'Histoire Chateaubriand 1997
2000: 
2000: 
2001: 
2003: 
2005: 
2006: 
2008:

Under his name 
1964: 
1967: 
1971: 
1970: 
1976: La Cité d’Isis – Histoire vraie des Arabes, 
1979: 
1987: 
1987:

References

External links 
 Official webwite
 Pierre Moustiers on Babelio
 Pierre Moustiers dans l'atelier de Rembrandt on L'Humanité (10 June 1995)
 Pierre Moustiers on Albin Michel
 Pierre Moustiers on the site of the Académie française
 
 
 
 

1924 births
People from La Seyne-sur-Mer
20th-century French novelists
Grand Prix du roman de l'Académie française winners
French screenwriters
Prix des libraires winners
Prix Maison de la Presse winners
2016 deaths